Aterigena is a genus of funnel weavers first described by A. Bolzern, A. Hänggi & D. Burckhardt in 2010. The name is an anagram of Tegenaria. It was created in 2010 for a group of Tegenaria and Malthonica species that formed a clade in a phylogenetic analysis. The genus was later found to be monophyletic, further separating Eratigena from Tegenaria and Malthonica.

Species
 it contains five species:

Aterigena aculeata (Wang, 1992) – China
Aterigena aliquoi (Brignoli, 1971) – Italy (Sicily)
Aterigena aspromontensis Bolzern, Hänggi & Burckhardt, 2010 – Italy
Aterigena ligurica (Simon, 1916) – France, Italy
Aterigena soriculata (Simon, 1873) – France (Corsica), Italy (Sardinia)

References

Agelenidae
Spiders of Asia
Araneomorphae genera